George Archibald Walters (30 March 1939 – December 2015) was a Scottish footballer, who played as a left winger in the English Football League.

References

External links

1939 births
2015 deaths
Scottish footballers
Footballers from Glasgow
Association football wingers
Clyde F.C. players
Oldham Athletic A.F.C. players
English Football League players
Scottish Football League players